PLUS ALBANIA Communication SH.A. (also known as PLUS) is a defunct Albanian-owned and operated telecommunications company. It was the 4th mobile operator in Albania by number of subscribers.

Opening
PLUS Communication was established in June 2009, after AKEP gave the Individual Authorization (license) as the bidder with the highest value, to provide mobile telephony services. The company started its commercial operations on December 6, 2010, and within a very short time managed to cover 99% of Albania territory with quality signal. 
 When PLUS ceased operating in 2018 it's frequencies where split between Vodafone and One.

International relations
PLUS, as the newest company in the telecommunications market, took advantage of using advance technology, as well as a consolidated network to cope with any future challenges, cooperating so with the prestigious international companies, such as Nokia Siemens, NEC and Comverse for provision of some of its equipment and services.

Services
All PLUS subscribers could take advantage of the network usage, various products and services, to fulfill their needs for an economic and full communication. 
Plus Communication was in a continuous process to upgrade and expand its network all over the country, to serve better to its customers. Fulfilling their demands and needs remained one of the priorities of the company, providing not only quality products and services, but also transparency and the right of choice.

PLUS was unique, being the only Albanian business operating in telecommunication market. Contrary to the other foreign and established mobile operators in the market, PLUS reinvested its profits in Albania, contributing to the country's development.

Market share
In 2012 Albania had 5.3 million subscribers (187% penetration rate), out of which there were 3.2 million active users (114% penetration rate). An active user is the number of users that communicated in the last three months.

The regulatory authority for telecommunication in Albania is the Electronic and Postal Communications Authority.

See also

 List of mobile network operators of Europe
 Vodafone
 Telekom
 Albtelecom

References

Mobile phone companies of Albania
Telecommunications companies established in 2010
Albanian brands
2010 establishments in Albania
Defunct companies of Albania
Telecommunications companies disestablished in 2018
2018 disestablishments in Albania